The 2010 California State Senate elections were held on November 2, 2010. Voters in the 20 even-numbered districts of the California State Senate voted for their representatives. Other elections were also held on November 2. No seats changed parties in this election.

Overview

Results

District 2

District 4

District 6

District 8

District 10

District 12

District 14

District 16

District 18

District 20

District 22

District 24

District 26

District 28 
Incumbent Jenny Oropeza died on October 20, 2010, from complications from a blood clot, and remained on the ballot. A special election was called after she posthumously won the election.

District 30

District 32

District 34

District 36

District 38

District 40 

State Senate
California State Senate elections
California State Senate